The 1895 North Dakota Flickertails football team was an American football team that represented North Dakota University as an independent during the 1895 college football season. They had a 1–1 record.

Schedule

References

North Dakota
North Dakota Fighting Hawks football seasons
North Dakota Flickertails football